The Costa Smeralda is a coastal area and tourist destination in northern Sardinia, Italy, with a length of some 20 km, although the term originally designated only a small stretch in the commune of Arzachena. With white sand beaches, golf clubs, private jet and helicopter services, and exclusive hotels, the area has drawn celebrities, business and political leaders, and other affluent visitors.

Costa Smeralda is the most expensive location in Europe. House prices reach up to 300,000 euros ($392,200) per square meter.

The main towns and villages in the area, built according to a detailed urban plan, are Porto Cervo, Liscia di Vacca, Capriccioli, and Romazzino. Archaeological sites include the Li Muri Giants' graves.

Each September the Sardinia Cup sailing regatta is held off the coast. Polo matches are held between April and October at Gershan near Arzachena. Other attractions include a film festival in Tavolara and a vintage car rally.

Development of the area started in 1961, and was financed by a consortium of companies led by Prince Karim Aga Khan. Spiaggia del Principe, one of the beaches along the Costa Smeralda, was named after this Ishmaelite prince. Architects involved in the project included Michele Busiri Vici, Jacques Couëlle, Savin Couëlle, and Vietti.

See also
Tourist destinations of Sardinia

References

External links 

Smeralda
Geographical, historical and cultural regions of Italy
Landforms of Sardinia
Tourist attractions in Sardinia